The Ashland Dam and Spillway is a historic site at the north end of Ashland Reservoir in Ashland State Park in Ashland, Massachusetts.  Ashland Reservoir was constructed in 1885, impounding a portion of Cold Spring Brook, a tributary of the Sudbury River.  The dam and spillway were built as part of Boston's second major water works effort, which impounded large portions of the upper Sudbury River.  They were listed on the National Register of Historic Places in 1990.

Description and history
Ashland State Park is located off West Union Street in southern Ashland, a rural outer suburb west of Boston. Its centerpiece is the former Ashland Reservoir, with the dam and spillway at its northern end. From that point, Cold Spring Brook flows north to join a branch of the Sudbury River. The spillway lies at the eastern end of the dam, and is constructed of granite rubble, and a series of steps made of granite laid in concrete. The dam was originally topped by a gatehouse; it was demolished in 1976 after repeated vandalism.

The dam and spillway were built in 1885 as one of the later elements of Boston's second major water supply system.  This system impounded large sections of the Sudbury River, primarily in Framingham, from where the water was piped toward Boston via the Sudbury Aqueduct.  Water impounded by the Ashland dam was originally fed to the aqueduct by a pair of  pipes.  By 1927 the reservoir was part of the system's backup elements, and a pipe was laid to feed its water into the Sudbury Reservoir; this pipe was never used.  The reservoir and surrounding land were turned over to the state, and are now administered by the Massachusetts Department of Conservation and Recreation.

See also
National Register of Historic Places listings in Middlesex County, Massachusetts

References

1885 establishments in Massachusetts
Ashland, Massachusetts
Dams completed in 1885
Dams in Massachusetts
Dams on the National Register of Historic Places in Massachusetts
National Register of Historic Places in Middlesex County, Massachusetts
Spillways